The Mambilla Hydroelectric Power Station is a 3,050 MW hydroelectric power project under development in Nigeria. When completed, it will be the largest power-generating installation in the country, and one of the largest hydroelectric power stations in Africa.

Location
The power station is located in Kakara village, in Taraba State, Nigeria. This is near the town of Gembu, close to the border with Cameroon. The power station sits across the Donga River, and consists of four dams and two underground power houses.

Overview

From this dam, water is diverted off the reservoir towards the western side of the plateau through four hydraulic tunnels totaling , intercepted by four smaller dams: Nya, Sum Sum, Nghu, and Api Weir.

Passing through a short tunnel, the water then exits the base of the plateau and flows into a tributary river that rejoins the Donga River downstream of the plateau.

Development
On 30 August 2017, the Federal Executive Council (FEC) approved the award of the construction contract to a consortium of Gezhouba Group, Sinohydro, and CGCOC Group.

The Mambilla Hydropower Plant Project has been planned for over 40 years. It is expected to connect to four dams across the Donga River. The first preliminary feasibility study for the Mambilla Hydropower Plant was reportedly carried out by Moto Columbus in 1972, but attempts to construct the power station up to now have been unsuccessful.

Funding
The total cost of the project is budgeted at US$5.8 billion. The Exim Bank of China has agreed to lend 85 percent (US$4.93 billion) towards the construction. The funds will be paid directly to the construction consortium in tranches, as the work progresses. The Federal Government of Nigeria has committed to contribute 15 percent (US$870 million) of the construction costs.

Construction
In November 2017, there were attempts to start construction of this power station. However, due to various constraints, including landslides, and a lawsuit at the International Court of Arbitration, the project stalled again. In February 2020, following the resolution of the lawsuit, there were fresh attempts to resume construction.

Construction is expected to take at least seven years from start to finish, due to the technical complexity of the project. A more realistic completion date is 2030.

Other considerations
Construction of this power station is expected to generate 50,000 temporary and permanent jobs. The power generated will be sold to the Transmission Company of Nigeria, which will transmit it to two locations, where it will be integrated into the Nigerian electricity grid; one 330kV high voltage transmission line will connect to Jalingo and two to Makurdi.

See also

 List of power stations in Nigeria
 Kashimbila Hydroelectric Power Station

References

External links
 Mambilla Hydropower Station Project, funded by Chinese lenders, in Nigeria, as of 14 February 2018.

Hydroelectric power stations in Nigeria
Taraba State
Proposed hydroelectric power stations
Underground power stations
Proposed renewable energy power stations in Nigeria